The Permanent Representative of Pakistan to the United Nations is Pakistan's diplomatic representative to the United Nations (UN). The permanent Representative (UN ambassador) is the head of Permanent Mission of Pakistan to the United Nations in New York, there is another Pakistan Mission based at the UNO office in Geneva, Switzerland.

The mission is usually headed by a career foreign service officer, but has historically been led by an eminent personalities from business, media, law and other areas and are usually political appointees. The current holder of the position is Munir Akram, prominent previous holders include Dr. Maleeha Lodhi, Masood Khan and Muhammad Zafarullah Khan.

List of ambassadors

References

External links
Pakistan Mission to the United Nations

Pakistan
United Nations